XYZ is the first solo album by Andy Summers. Released in 1987, it is to date his only album to feature him singing his own lyrics, though he performs a wordless vocal on his 1991 album World Gone Strange.

Background
During his tenure with The Police, Summers had worked on a number of outside projects, including two albums of instrumental music with fellow guitarist Robert Fripp and music for films such Down and Out in Beverly Hills and 2010: The Year We Make Contact. Following the official break-up of The Police in 1986, Summers, like his bandmates Sting and Stewart Copeland, embarked on a more ambitious solo career. Summers partnered with producer and musician David Hentschel, known for his work with Genesis. Summers was the first Police member to leave A&M Records, choosing instead to work with MCA. The album was recorded in 1986 at Devo's studio in Los Angeles, California. Many of the songs had been demoed in the Police years and put forward for consideration for Sting to sing on a Police album. Summers took lead vocals himself, and played bass as well as his usual array of guitars. Drum programming was favoured over the use of real drums, a production choice popular in the mid-1980s. The title "XYZ" comes from the middle names of Summers's three children. His daughter Layla (born 1978) has the middle name 'Z', and his twin sons, Maurice and Anton, (born 1987) have the middle names 'X' and 'Y' respectively. The cover portrait is by Anton Corbijn.

"Love is the Strangest Way" was released as a single. The promotional video was inspired by the work of Maya Deren and shot as a short black and white film, with Summers and his love interest desperately trying to meet in a room full of people. Summers commented: "I didn't like any of [The Police] videos. We were always made to look bright, inoffensive and appealing. As videos progressed, they started to move away from that: they got hipper, people started using Super 8 and handheld techniques, and everything got darker and more interesting."

Another track, "Carry Me Back Home" (5:04), was recorded during the XYZ sessions for the soundtrack of the film Band of the Hand and released on the B-side of the 12-inch version of the "Love is the Strangest Way" single. Charlotte Caffey, from the new-wave band the Go-Gos, did not play in the album but she co-authored the title track with Summers and Hentschel and is acknowledged for her support in the credits.

Reception
Summers put together a six-piece band and toured extensively to promote the album, augmenting the set list with Police material such as "Tea in the Sahara" and "Omega Man", the latter of which had never been played live by The Police. Both the single and the album failed to chart, prompting Summers to return to the kind of instrumental music he had explored on the two albums he had recorded with Robert Fripp for most of his future career.

Track listing

Personnel
 Andy Summers – guitar, bass guitar, vocals, producer
 David Hentschel – keyboards, drum programming, percussion, production
 Nan Vernon – vocals on "Love Is the Strangest Way", "How Many Days" and "Almost There"; backing vocals on "Eyes of a Stranger"
 Chris Childs – bass guitar on "Eyes of a Stranger"
 Rick May – bass guitar on "Hold Me"
 Abraham Laboriel – bass guitar on "Scary Voices"
 Michael G. Fisher – percussion on "Nowhere", "Love Is the Strangest Way" and "Almost There"
 Greta Gold – additional backing vocals on "Eyes of a Stranger"
 Oren, Julia, and Maxine Waters – backing vocals on "Nowhere", "Hold Me" and "How Many Days"

Technical
 Bob Casale – mixing and engineering
 Anton Corbijn – photography

References

1987 albums
MCA Records albums
Andy Summers albums
Albums produced by David Hentschel